Équipe Paule Ka was a professional cycling team based in Switzerland, which competed in elite road bicycle racing events such as the UCI Women's World Tour.

Team history

2015
For the 2015 season the team announced the signing of Annemiek van Vleuten, Ashleigh Moolman Shelley Olds, Doris Schweizer, Iris Slappendel and Sharon Laws. The team also extended the contracts of Vera Koedooder and Lotta Lepistö. On October 30 the Cyclingnews.com announced the signing of Joëlle Numainville. On November 20 the team signed Clara Koppenburg and Caroline Baur as well as extending the contracts of Nicole Hanselmann and Emilie Aubry. On December 1 Jacqueline Hahn and Désirée Ehrler left the team to join Feminine Cycling Team.

2016
In September 2015 it was announced that Cervélo, who supplied bicycle frames for the team in 2015, would become a title sponsor for the 2016 season, with the team becoming Cervélo–Bigla Pro Cycling.

In September 2016, the team announced that British rider Ciara Horne would be joining with immediate effect, and would compete with the team in the team time trial at the World Championships.

2020 funding issues
In June 2020, the team's title sponsors Bigla and Katusha Sports announced they would withdraw funding for the team, with the team having to access their UCI bank guarantee in previous months in order to pay rider and staff wages. Paule Ka, a French ready-to-wear clothing brand was later announced as the new title sponsor for the team, agreeing to a deal through to the end of 2024. In October there was uncertainty over the team's future with the team drawing on a UCI bank guarantee to pay rider's salaries. On 16 October the team announced that it would cease racing and close with immediate effect.

Team roster

Major wins

National and continental champions

2005
 Kazakhstan Time Trial, Zoulfia Zabirov
 Kazakhstan Road Race, Zoulfia Zabirova
2006
 Kazakhstan Time Trial, Zoulfia Zabirov
2007
 Kazakhstan Time Trial, Zoulfia Zabirov
 Kazakhstan Road Race, Zoulfia Zabirova
2008
 Switzerland Track (Omnium), Andrea Wölfer
 Kazakhstan Time Trial, Zoulfia Zabirov
 Kazakhstan Road Race, Zoulfia Zabirova
 Switzerland Road Race, Jennifer Hohl
2009
 Italy Time Trial, Noemi Cantele
 Switzerland Time Trial, Karin Thürig
 Switzerland Road Race, Jennifer Hohl
2012
 Switzerland Time Trial (Juniors), Caroline Baur
2013
 Austria Road Race, Andrea Graus
2014
 Austria Road Race, Jacqueline Hahn
 Finland Road Race, Lotta Lepistö
2015
 South Africa Time Trial, Ashleigh Moolman
 South Africa Road Race, Ashleigh Moolman
 African Time Trial, Ashleigh Moolman
 African Road Race, Ashleigh Moolman
 Finland Time Trial, Lotta Lepistö
 Switzerland Time Trial, Doris Schweizer
 Canada Road Race, Joëlle  Numainville
 Finland Road Race, Lotta Lepistö
 Netherlands Track (Points race), Vera Koedooder
2016
 USA Time Trial, Carmen Small
 Finland Time Trial, Lotta Lepistö
 Finland Road Race, Lotta Lepistö
 Germany Track (Individual Pursuit), Lisa Klein
2017
 South Africa Time Trial, Ashleigh Moolman
 Finland Time Trial, Lotta Lepistö
 Finland Road Race, Lotta Lepistö
 Denmark Time Trial, Cecilie Uttrup Ludwig
 Germany Road Race, Lisa Klein
 Switzerland Road Race, Nicole Hanselmann
 Poland Track (Scratch race), Daria Pikulik
2018
 Belgium Time Trial, Ann-Sophie Duyck
 Finland Time Trial, Lotta Lepistö
 Switzerland Time Trial, Nicole Hanselmann
 Denmark Time Trial, Cecilie Uttrup Ludwig
 Finland Road Race, Lotta Lepistö
2019
 European Track (Madison), Julie Leth
2020
 New Zealand Road Race, Niamh Fisher-Black
 New Zealand U23 Road Race, Niamh Fisher-Black
 Switzerland Time Trial, Marlen Reusser
 Czech Time Trial, Nikola Nosková 
 Denmark Road Race, Emma Cecilie Norsgaard

References

External links

Cycling teams based in Switzerland
UCI Women's Teams
Cycling teams established in 2005